The William Washington Gordon Monument is a public monument in Savannah, Georgia, United States. Located in Wright Square, the monument honors politician and businessman William Washington Gordon and was designed by Henry Van Brunt and Frank M. Howe. It was completed in 1883.

History 
William Washington Gordon was a railroad baron during the mid-1800s who served as the founder and first president of the Central of Georgia Railway. He was also the father of Juliette Gordon Low, the founder of the Girl Scouts of the USA. In 1842, Gordon passed away at the age of 46. Several years later, in 1883, efforts were underway to erect a monument in honor of Gordon in Savannah. At Wright Square, a pyramid of rocks that marked the burial place of Tomochichi was removed to make way for the monument. Tomochichi was a Yamacraw chief who aided the early settlers of Savannah, and after his death in 1739, he was buried at Wright Square, with General James Oglethorpe serving as one of his pallbearers. Tomochichi's body was relocated from the center of the square to the southeast corner to make way for the new monument. Nellie Gordon, Gordon's daughter-in-law and the first president of the Georgia branch of the National Society of the Colonial Dames of America, would later advocate for a new monument to be erected in honor of Tomochichi, which occurred several years later in 1899. The monument to Gordon, completed in 1883 with funds from the Central of Georgia Railway, was completed in 1883. It was designed by the architects Henry Van Brunt and Frank M. Howe.

In 1958, a Georgia historical marker was erected in the square that detailed the history of the monument and surrounding area.

Design 
The monument consists of a granite pedestal supporting four marble columns. An urn is located between these columns, and at the top of the monument is a globe. One side of the monument features a carving of a train on a trestle bridge, while another two sides feature the following inscriptions:

See also 

 1883 in art

References

External links 
 

1883 establishments in Georgia (U.S. state)
1883 sculptures
Landmarks in Savannah, Georgia
Monuments and memorials in Savannah, Georgia
Outdoor sculptures in Georgia (U.S. state)
Wright Square (Savannah) monuments